Corporation Street may refer to:

Corporation Street, Birmingham
Corporation Street, Manchester
Corporation Street Bridge, Manchester
Sheffield Inner Ring Road